Jastrzębia  is a village in the administrative district of Gmina Góra, within Góra County, Lower Silesian Voivodeship, in south-western Poland.

The name of the village is of Polish origin and comes from the word jastrząb, which means "hawk".

References

Villages in Góra County